Orzechowo  (German Nossberg) is a village in the administrative district of Gmina Dobre Miasto, within Olsztyn County, Warmian-Masurian Voivodeship, in northern Poland.

Before 1772 the area was part of Kingdom of Poland, 1772–1945 Prussia and Germany (East Prussia).

The village has an approximate population of 710.

References

Orzechowo